Glemby Alvin "Glen" Richardson (April 18, 1927 – October 12, 2017), born "Glemby Alvin Mosley", was an American Negro league second baseman in the 1940s.

A native of Bayonne, New Jersey, Richardson attended Tottenville High School, and played for the New York Black Yankees in 1946 and 1947. He was inducted into the Staten Island Sports Hall of Fame in 2014, and died in 2017 at age 90.

References

External links
 and Seamheads

1927 births
2017 deaths
Place of death missing
New York Black Yankees players
20th-century African-American sportspeople
21st-century African-American people